is a Japanese professional golfer.

Taniguchi plays on the Japan Golf Tour. He has won twice on tour and once on the Japan Challenge Tour.

Professional wins (3)

Japan Golf Tour wins (2)

Japan Challenge Tour wins (1)

Team appearances
World Cup (representing Japan): 2005
Dynasty Cup (representing Japan): 2005

External links

Japanese male golfers
Japan Golf Tour golfers
Sportspeople from Tokushima Prefecture
1979 births
Living people